Battle of Mogadishu may refer to:

 Battle of Mogadishu (1993), also known as the Black Hawk Down incident, a battle in which United States, Pakistani, and Malaysian forces fought forces of Somali warlord Mohamed Farrah Aidid
 Battle of Mogadishu (2006), a battle in which the Islamic Courts Union attacked the ARPCT
 Battle of Mogadishu (March–April 2007), a battle in which the Transitional Federal Government and Ethiopian Army battled the insurgents of the Islamist PRM and the Hawiye clan
 Battle of Mogadishu (November 2007), a battle between the TFG/Ethiopia and the Islamist PRM
 Battle of Mogadishu (2008), a battle between the TFG/Ethiopia and the Islamist PRM
 Battle of Mogadishu (2009), a stand-off between al-Shabaab and Hizbul Islam rebels and the TFG-ARS Alliance
 Battle of Mogadishu (2010–11), a battle between al-Shabaab and the ICU/TFG Alliance

See also
 Mogadishu bombings (disambiguation)
 Checkpoint Pasta battle, a 1993 battle between Italian forces and Somali warlord Mohamed Farrah Aidid in Mogadishu near an abandoned Barilla pasta factory
 2021 Mogadishu mutiny
 Battle of South Mogadishu, an armed clash between the TFG and Hizbul Islam in February 2009
 Fall of Mogadishu, a 2006 battle in which the Transitional Federal Government and Ethiopian Army attacked the Islamic Courts Union